The 2012 Kawasaki Frontale season is Kawasaki Frontale's eighth consecutive season in J. League Division 1 and 11th overall in the Japanese top flight. Kawasaki Frontale also competed in the 2012 Emperor's Cup and 2012 J. League Cup.

Players

Competitions

J. League

League table

Matches

J. League Cup

Emperor's Cup

References

Kawasaki Frontale
Kawasaki Frontale seasons